The Pyrénées Animal Park (French: Parc Animalier des Pyrénées), nicknamed The Marmots Hill is located in Argelès-Gazost in the Hautes-Pyrénées, France. It was created in 1999 by Serge Mounard, an individual, on a property operated by his dairy producing family. His idea was to present visitors a number of regional animals in a semi-wild environment. The path, in zigzag in the hills, gave the chance to admire common animals like the squirrel, marmot and otter, but also to approach foxes within a few meters, wolves, ibex, mouflons, isards or brown bears. It was even possible to touch some species, like farm animals (hens, rabbits), a deer, as well as the main parc attraction: marmots.

A pedagogical team would verify the visitors' demeanour, while keeping them informed – along with didactical panels. A Pyrenean map, regularly updated, shows in real time the position of each member of the 25 bears currently living in freedom in the massif. A footprint molding workshop enables visitors to learn how to recognize animal footprints in the wild.

The building at the entrance (an old bigourdan stable from the middle of the 19th century) hosts a museum reconstructing, under thematical tableaus in three oral dimensions the life of wild animals of the northern hemisphere, Europe and Africa. A souvenir shop lies at the exit – with marmot stuffed toys, namely.

Short list of animals in the park 
 Marmot
 Deer
 European otter (in a setting which allows the visitor to see them thrive in and out of the water)
 Squirrel
 Brown bear
 Fox
 Wolf
 Isard
 Mouflon
 Lynx
 Ibex
 Giant otter (rarely seen)

External links 
parc-animalier-pyrenees.com
Reportage vidéo sur le parc

Buildings and structures in Hautes-Pyrénées
Tourist attractions in Hautes-Pyrénées
Zoos in France
Zoos established in 1999
1999 establishments in France
Articles needing infobox zoo
Organizations based in Occitania (administrative region)